Caterina Granz (born 14 March 1994 in Berlin) is a German middle-distance runner who specialises in the 1500 metres. She won gold medal at the 2019 Summer Universiade.

Competition record

Personal bests
Outdoor
800 metres – 2:03.46 (Metz 2019)
1500 metres – 4:07.77 (Lahti 2019)
3000 metres – 9:13.02 (Kiel 2016)
5000 metres – 15:46.64 (Nijmegen 2018)
5 kilometres – 17:02 (Bolzano 2017)
10 kilometres – 34:02 (Berlin 2017)

Indoor
800 metres – 2:10.66 (Berlin 2014)
1500 metres – 4:11.38 (Linz 2019)
3000 metres – 8:56.29 (Dortmund 2018)

References

1994 births
Living people
German female middle-distance runners
Athletes from Berlin
Universiade gold medalists in athletics (track and field)
Universiade gold medalists for Germany
Medalists at the 2019 Summer Universiade
Athletes (track and field) at the 2020 Summer Olympics
Olympic athletes of Germany
21st-century German women